Menachem Shlomo Bornsztain (11 October 1934–10 August 1969), also spelled Borenstein, Bornstein, or Bernstein, was the fifth rebbe of the Sochatchov Hasidic dynasty. He succeeded his father, Chanoch Henoch Bornsztain. He was known as the Sochatchover-Radomsker Rebbe, having also accepted the leadership of the Radomsk Hasidic dynasty upon the request of its surviving Hasidim, whose leaders had been murdered in the Holocaust. He served as rebbe for only four years; he was killed in a traffic accident at the age of 34.

Early life
Bornsztain's father was the son of  Shmuel Bornsztain. His mother, Freidel, was a granddaughter of Yechezkel Rabinowicz of Radomsk. At his circumcision ceremony, which normally takes place at eight days old but was delayed until his sixth week of life due to illness, he was named Menachem Shlomo after his paternal great-grandfather, Rabbi Menachem Mendel of Kotzk, and his maternal ancestor, Rabbi Shlomo Rabinowicz.

He attended a private Talmud Torah in Jerusalem and became a student at the Knesses Chizkiyahu yeshiva in Zikhron Ya'akov in 1950.

Bornsztain married the daughter of a Tel Aviv rabbi.

Career 
He became rabbi of the Sochatchover shtiebel on Rashi Street in Tel Aviv in 1960 and the rabbi of Tel Aviv's Yad Eliyahu neighborhood in 1965.

Starting in 1965 Bornsztain led Kollel Keser Torah Radomsk in Bnei Brak, named after the network of 36 yeshivas in pre-war Poland established by the fourth Radomsker rebbe and headed by Bornsztain's uncle, David Moshe Rabinowicz, who had been murdered by the Nazis in the Warsaw Ghetto.

Bornsztain succeeded his father, who died in 1965, as Sochatchover rebbe. Bornsztain also became the rebbe of the Radomsker Hasidim who had survived the Holocaust, and became known as the Sochatchover-Radomsker Rebbe.

Death and succession 
On 10 August 1969 (26 Av 5729) Bornsztain was thrown from a taxi when an army vehicle crashed into it head-on. He died of his injuries the next day.

A few years after his death, his eldest son, Shmuel, became the sixth Sochatchover rebbe.

Rebbes of Sochatchov
 Avrohom Bornsztain, the Avnei Nezer (1838–1910)
 Shmuel Bornsztain, the Shem Mishmuel (1856–1926)
 Dovid Bornsztain (1876–1942)
 Chanoch Henoch Bornsztain (d. 1965)
 Menachem Shlomo Bornsztain (1934–1969)
 Shmuel Bornsztain (b. 1961)

Rebbes of Radomsk
Shlomo Hakohen Rabinowicz, the Tiferes Shlomo (1801–1866)
 Avraham Yissachar Dov Hakohen Rabinowicz, the Chesed L'Avraham (1843–1892)
 Yechezkel Hakohen Rabinowicz, the Kenesses Yechezkel (1862–1910)
 Shlomo Chanoch Hakohen Rabinowicz, the Shivchei Kohen (1882–1942)
 Menachem Shlomo Bornsztain, Sochatchover-Radomsker Rebbe (1934–1969)

References

1934 births
1969 deaths
Rebbes of Sochatchov
Rebbes of Radomsk
20th-century Israeli rabbis
Israeli Hasidic rabbis
Road incident deaths in Israel